The following radio stations broadcast on FM frequency 98.1 MHz:

Argentina
 Radio María in Alta Gracia, Córdoba
 Radio María in Rosario del Tala, Entre Ríos
 Radio María in Emilia, Santa Fe
 Show in Posadas, Misiones
 Sport Casilda in Casilda, Santa Fe

Australia
 ABC NewsRadio in Gosford, New South Wales
 2WIN in Illawarra, New South Wales
 2VLY in Muswellbrook, New South Wales
 Radio National in Yulara, Northern Territory
 Vision Radio Network in Townsville, Queensland
 Radio TAB in Coober Pedy, South Australia
 Radio National in Corryong, Victoria
3ECB in Melbourne, Victoria
 The Spirit Network in Geraldton, Western Australia

Belize
LOVE FM

Brazil
 Rádio Globo in Rio de Janeiro, Rio de Janeiro

Canada
 CBAF-FM-23 in Kedgwick, New Brunswick
 CBMF-FM in St-Jovite, Quebec
 CBOF-FM-6 in Cornwall, Ontario
 CBON-FM in Sudbury, Ontario
 CBSI-FM in Sept-Iles, Quebec
 CBTQ-FM in Port Alberni, British Columbia
 CBVA-FM in Escuminac, Quebec
 CBXJ-FM in Jasper, Alberta
 CFCW-FM in Camrose, Alberta
 CFGE-FM-1 in Magog, Quebec
 CFMQ-FM in Hudson Bay, Saskatchewan
 CHFI-FM in Toronto, Ontario
 CHOI-FM in Quebec City, Quebec
 CHON-FM in Whitehorse, Yukon
 CHPB-FM in Cochrane, Ontario
 CHRH-FM in Rocky Harbour, Newfoundland and Labrador
 CHSU-FM-1 in Big White Ski, British Columbia
 CHTD-FM in St. Stephen, New Brunswick
 CIFS-FM in Tumbler Ridge, British Columbia
 CIGV-FM-2 in Princeton, British Columbia
 CJTL-FM-1 in Thunder Bay, Ontario
 CKBW-FM in Bridgewater, Nova Scotia
 CKLO-FM in London, Ontario
 CKBD-FM in Lethbridge, Alberta
 VF2038 in Upper Liard, Yukon
 VF2059 in Fermont, Quebec
 VF2117 in Kitkatla, British Columbia
 VF2119 in Prince Rupert, British Columbia
 VF2134 in Canim Lake, British Columbia
 VF2141 in Dease Lake, British Columbia
 VF2147 in Destruction Bay, Yukon
 VF2163 in Hazelton, British Columbia
 VF2165 in Kitwanga, British Columbia
 VF2166 in Tachie, British Columbia
 VF2226 in Canyon City, British Columbia
 VF2231 in Fort Babine, British Columbia
 VF2234 in Stony Creek Indian Reserve, British Columbia
 VF2274 in Fort Fraser, British Columbia
 VF2277 in Wells, British Columbia
 VF2306 in Atlin, British Columbia
 VF2311 in Lower Post, British Columbia
 VF2353 in Good Hope Indian Reserve, British Columbia
 VF2451 in Voisey Bay, Newfoundland and Labrador
 VF2472 in Fort Simpson, Northwest Territories
 VF2514 in Blue River, British Columbia
 VF2549 in Pemberton, British Columbia
 VF2582 in Havre St-Pierre, Quebec

China 
 CNR Business Radio in Yantai
 CRI News Radio in Yizhou

Ireland
 98FM in Dublin
 RTÉ Lyric FM in Dungarvan

Malaysia
 Nasional FM in Brunei
 Zayan in Kedah, Perlis & Penang

Mexico

 XHASU-FM in Asunción Nochixtlán, Oaxaca
 XHBCD-FM in Pachuca, Hidalgo
 XHCV-FM in Ciudad Valles, San Luis Potosí
 XHELI-FM in Morelia, Michoacán
 XHGSE-FM in Guasave, Sinaloa
 XHIRC-FM in Colima, Colima
 XHKZ-FM in Santo Domingo Tehuantepec, Oaxaca
 XHLH-FM in Acaponeta, Nayarit
 XHMAXX-FM in San Martín Texmelucan, Puebla
 XHNG-FM in Cuernavaca, Morelos
 XHNM-FM in Jesús María, Aguascalientes
 XHPCPG-FM in Chilpancingo, Guerrero
 XHPJOA-FM in Navojoa, Sonora
 XHPNX-FM in Santiago Pinotepa Nacional, Oaxaca
 XHPSOT-FM in Soteapan, Veracruz
 XHPYA-FM in Playa del Carmen, Quintana Roo
 XHPZAM-FM in Zamora, Michoacán
 XHRL-FM in Monterrey, Nuevo León
 XHU-FM in Boca del Río, Veracruz
 XHWX-FM in Durango, Durango

New Zealand
Newstalk ZB at Ashburton, Canterbury, South Island

United Kingdom
 BBC Radio 1 in Barnstaple, Blaenavon, Bradford, Cwmafan, Firth of Clyde, Skye & Lochalsh, South Devon, Tyne and Wear 
 Bro Radio in Barry

United States
 KALG in Kaltag, Alaska
  in Meeker, Colorado
 KBAC in Las Vegas, New Mexico
  in Blue Earth, Minnesota
  in Carson City, Nevada
 KBWR-LP in Burns, Oregon
 KCFS-LP in El Dorado Hills, California
 KCTC-LP in San Antonio, Texas
 KDRU-LP in Springfield, Missouri
 KENL-LP in St. Paul, Minnesota
  in Milford, Nebraska
 KGTM in Shelley, Idaho
  in Cedar Rapids, Iowa
 KHUS (FM) in Huslia, Alaska
 KIMU-LP in Stockton, California
 KINC-LP in Little Rock, Arkansas
  in Seattle, Washington
 KIOR-LP in Omaha, Nebraska
 KISC in Spokane, Washington
  in San Francisco, California
 KJAJ-LP in Coos Bay, Oregon
  in Lihue, Hawaii
  in Lorenzo, Texas
 KKFM in Colorado Springs, Colorado
  in San Luis Obispo, California
  in Anchorage, Alaska
  in Kansas City, Kansas
 KMFO-LP in Tulsa, Oklahoma
 KMKE-LP in Eureka, California
 KNFS-LP in Tulare, California
 KOWW-LP in Burlington, North Dakota
 KOYU in Koyukuk, Alaska
  in Cabool, Missouri
 KPFV-LP in Pahrump, Nevada
 KQHU-LP in Honolulu, Hawaii
 KQTX in Quanah, Texas
 KRBY in Ruby, Alaska
 KREC in Brian Head, Utah
 KRRG in Laredo, Texas
 KRWI in Wofford Heights, California
 KRXV in Yermo, California
 KSKZ in Copeland, Kansas
 KSPL-LP in John Day, Oregon
 KSYU in Saint Marys, Alaska
  in Texarkana, Texas
 KTBX in Tubac, Arizona
 KTLT in Anson, Texas
 KTPB in Altheimer, Arkansas
  in Dearing, Kansas
  in Austin, Texas
  in Redding, California
  in Fairbanks, Alaska
 KXSN in San Diego, California
  in Saint Louis, Missouri
 KZRC in Bennington, Oklahoma
 WACF-LP in Brookfield, Massachusetts
  in Galax, Virginia
  in Lexington, Kentucky
  in New Bedford, Massachusetts
 WCXQ-LP in Isabela-Camuy, Puerto Rico
  in Van Buren, Maine
  in Defiance, Ohio
 WDGL in Baton Rouge, Louisiana
 WDTZ-LP in Delhi Township, Ohio
 WEDB (FM) in East Dublin, Georgia
  in Kingsford, Michigan
 WEVT-LP in Enosburg Falls, Vermont
  in Altoona, Pennsylvania
  in Glen Arbor, Michigan
 WGUA-LP in Lawrence, Massachusetts
 WHWK in Binghamton, New York
  in Holt, Florida
 WHZT in Williamston, South Carolina
  in Earl Park, Indiana
 WILP in Cuba, Illinois
 WISM-FM in Altoona, Wisconsin
  in Rutland, Vermont
  in Saginaw, Michigan
 WKDD in Canton, Ohio
  in Salisbury, Connecticut
 WLEZ-LP in Jackson, Mississippi
 WLKN in Cleveland, Wisconsin
  in Signal Mountain, Tennessee
  in Madison, Wisconsin
  in Hogansville, Georgia
  in Dawson, Georgia
 WMXI in Ellisville, Mississippi
 WNRE-LP in Duluth, Georgia
  in Deltona, Florida
  in Manteo, North Carolina
  in Selbyville, Delaware
 WOGL in Philadelphia, Pennsylvania
  in Hamden, Connecticut
  in Live Oak, Florida
  in Fayetteville, North Carolina
  in Princeton, Indiana
  in Richmond, Virginia
  in Fayette, Alabama
  in Dayton, Ohio
  in Saint Cloud, Minnesota
 WWLS-FM in The Village, Oklahoma
 WXHD in Santa Isabel, Puerto Rico
 WXMX in Millington, Tennessee
 WXNE-LP in Pontiac, South Carolina
 WXNZ-LP in Skowhegan, Maine
  in Folly Beach, South Carolina
 WZCL-LP in Cabo Rojo, Puerto Rico
 WZOE-FM in Princeton, Illinois

References

Lists of radio stations by frequency